Gioacchino Cascone (born 6 March 1972) is an Italian rower. He competed in the men's eight event at the 2000 Summer Olympics.

References

External links
 

1972 births
Living people
Italian male rowers
Olympic rowers of Italy
Rowers at the 2000 Summer Olympics
People from Castellammare di Stabia
Sportspeople from the Province of Naples